The Maine Presents: The Pioneer World Tour is the third concert tour by the American rock band The Maine, in support of their third studio album Pioneer (2011). The tour consisted of 49 shows in the Philippines, North America, Brazil, United Kingdom, Europe and Argentina. the tour launched at SM North Edsa Skydome in Quezon City, Philippines on March 31, 2012.

Opening acts
 Lydia
 Arkells (selected dates)
 This Century<

Set list
According to PropertyOfZach.
 "Identify"
 "My Heroine"
 "Listen To Heart"
 "Thinking of You"
 "This is the End"
 "While Listening to Rock & Roll"
 "Some Days"
 "We'll All Be..."
 "Every Road"
 "Into Your Arms"
 "Misery"
 "When I'm at Home"
 "Inside of You"
 "Take Me Dancing"
 "The Way We Talk"
 "Like We Did (Windows Down)"
 "Right Girl"
 "With a Little Help from My Friends"
 "Don't Give Up on "Us""

Tour dates

References

2012 concert tours